Prism Skylabs is a technology company headquartered in San Francisco, California that connects cameras within businesses to machine learning and A.I. technology in the cloud, to transform these devices into tools for Business Intelligence.  Prism launched as a company in 2011 at the TechCrunch Disrupt awards, where it was featured as a finalist in the Startup Battlefield competition. Prism Skylabs' technology is deployed in over 80 countries and is used by more than 300 customers around the world.

Product
Prism Skylabs provides several mobile and web applications that are used by enterprise customers to make decisions using data from the cameras that are deployed throughout their businesses. Prism launched a mobile application in 2016, Vision, which allows users to search for the presence of specific objects and content within video using tags powered by neural networks. 

Prism Skylabs’ retail web application is cloud-based software that connects to a retailer’s existing video surveillance cameras. The software compresses the video data and sends it to cloud servers, where it is analyzed by Prism Skylabs’ video analytics technology. The company sends the analyzed data back to the retailer in the form of statistics and visualizations. To address privacy concerns, the software blurs or completely deletes images of people and replaces them with graphical elements.

The resulting information is intended to help businesses make sense of the large amounts of incoming video data. Prism Skylabs’ goal is to enable companies to better analyze long-term trends, such as number of customers, check-out queue lengths, foot traffic patterns, dwell time and the most popular products in a store. Retailers use this information to improve merchandising, store layout and customer service efforts and increase operational efficiencies.

History
Prism Skylabs was founded by Steve Russell and Ron Palmeri in July 2011. Its investors include Andreessen Horowitz, Anthem Venture Partners, CrunchFund, Data Collective, Expa, Intel Capital, Pacific Partners, Presidio Ventures, Promus, SV Angel, Tomorrow Ventures and Triangle Peak Partners. The company secured $7.5 million in Series A funding in 2011 and an additional $15 million in Series B funding in October 2013. It currently has about 30 employees.

References

Companies based in San Francisco